Kevin Barnett (August 7, 1986 – January 22, 2019) was an American stand-up comedian and actor. Barnett was the co-creator of “Rel,” a sitcom starring Lil Rel Howery that debuted on Fox in September of 2018. Barnett was also a writer on Comedy Central's Broad City and The Carmichael Show. Barnett started his career on MTV's Guy Code before becoming a co-creator of the sketch comedy show Friends of the People. He was also featured in the Mike Birbiglia film Sleepwalk with Me.  Barnett died unexpectedly of non-traumatic pancreatitis at the age of 32 while on a vacation. Tributes poured out in his memory across the comedy world.

References 

1986 births
2019 deaths